Jamie Geller (born May 29, 1978) is the Chief Media and Marketing Officer at Aish. She is also a best-selling cookbook author, celebrity chef, television producer and businesswoman. She is an author of 8 cookbooks and the founder of Kosher Media Network (now called Kosher Network International).In 2010, the network launched the Joy of Kosher with Jamie Geller online cooking show, print magazine and PBS Chanukah special. She has been called "The Kosher Rachael Ray" by the Miami Herald. and the Queen of Kosher:
Geller has sold close to 100,000 cookbooks.

Early life and education
Geller was born in Philadelphia and raised in a Jewish home in Abington, Pennsylvania. She attended Akiba Hebrew Academy High School. At New York University Geller studied broadcast journalism and Hebrew language and literature and graduated magna cum laude, Phi Beta Kappa in May 1999. Geller is a baalat teshuva, having embraced Orthodox Judaism and traditional Jewish religious practice in her early 20s.

Career
Before writing her first cookbook, Geller was a writer and television producer for CNN, Entertainment News, the Food Network, and a senior writer/producer and marketing executive for HBO.

In 2007, Geller published Quick and Kosher Recipes from the Bride Who Knew Nothing (Feldheim Publishers). The book chronicles her experience of choosing Orthodox Judaism, her marriage and learning to cook. In 2010 Geller published Quick & Kosher: Meals in Minutes (Feldheim Publishers). She didn't know how to cook before she got married but learned out of necessity. In over 15 years of experience, she's published 8 books, a website with over 10,000 recipes and videos with over 1 billion views.

In 2021, Geller launched a product line of spices, honey, pilaf and the like.

In 2021, Geller partnered with Aish to create a media network. Geller was named as Aish’s new Chief Media and Marketing Officer.

Kosher Network International which includes JamieGeller.com, @jamiegeller, and @jewlishbyjamie, was named the No. 1 global kosher food media company and Jewish food network. The Jewish food and lifestyle brands have over 2 million followers across social media.

Published works
Quick & Kosher Recipes from the Bride Who Knew Nothing (2007, Feldheim Publishers)
Quick & Kosher: Meals in Minutes (2010, Feldheim Publishers)
Joy of Kosher with Jamie Geller (a magazine)
Joy of Kosher: Fast, Fresh Family Recipes  (2013, William Morrow)
No Mistaking Baking: 85+ foolproof, fail proof, perfect every time recipes  (2018)
Jamie Geller's Brisket 101  (2018) 
Jewlish by Jamie  (2020, Feldheim Publishers)
28 Day Joy of Kosher Challenge (2020, Blurb)
Farmer’s Kitchen: 50 Recipes Celebrating Israel’s Veggies and Their Growers  (2022)

The New York Times noted that she "writes recipes for kosher.com."

Personal life
In August 2012, Geller made aliyah to Israel and settled in Beit Shemesh.

References

External links
 

21st-century American businesspeople
Jack M. Barrack Hebrew Academy alumni
American chief executives of food industry companies
American emigrants to Israel
American food company founders
American food writers
American magazine publishers (people)
American marketing businesspeople
American mass media company founders
American media executives
American Orthodox Jews
American television chefs
American television writers
Baalei teshuva
Businesspeople from New York (state)
Businesspeople from Pennsylvania
CNN people
Women cookbook writers
HBO people
Israeli television chefs
Israeli chief executives
Israeli mass media people
Israeli Orthodox Jews
Israeli television producers
21st-century Israeli businesswomen
21st-century Israeli businesspeople
Israeli women writers
Jewish American writers
Jewish women writers
Living people
Naturalized citizens of Israel
New York University alumni
People from Abington Township, Montgomery County, Pennsylvania
Mass media people from Jerusalem
People from Rockland County, New York
Television producers from New York City
American women television writers
Writers from New York City
Writers from Philadelphia
American women chefs
Screenwriters from New York (state)
Television producers from Pennsylvania
American women television producers
American women chief executives
Jewish American chefs
Chefs from New York City
Chefs from Pennsylvania
American YouTubers
Israeli YouTubers
Israeli people of American-Jewish descent
Food and cooking YouTubers
1978 births
21st-century American businesswomen
21st-century American Jews
Israeli women chief executive officers
Writers from Jerusalem